Brisbane Times is an online newspaper for Brisbane and Queensland, Australia.

History
The Brisbane Times was launched on 7 March 2007 by then-Queensland Premier Peter Beattie. The publication started with 14 journalists in an attempt by Fairfax to break into the South East Queensland market, competing against the website of News Corporation's incumbent The Courier-Mail.

As of 20 November 2018, Brisbane Times has started a subscription model. Viewers are limited to approximately 25 article views per month before being faced with a news paywall.

Ownership
It is owned and run by Nine Publishing, publishers of Melbourne's The Age, The Sydney Morning Herald and other mastheads, plus subject-focused websites and business-centered magazine titles.  The founding managing editor was Mitchell Murphy; the current editor is Sean Parnell.

Web traffic
According to third-party web analytics providers Alexa and SimilarWeb, the Brisbane Times is the 191st and 250th most visited website in Australia respectively, as of August 2015. SimilarWeb rates the site as the 24th most visited news website in Australia, attracting more than 2 million visitors per month.

See also

 List of newspapers in Australia

References

External links
 
 Newspapers of Australia

2007 establishments in Australia
Internet properties established in 2007
Mass media in Brisbane
Australian news websites